Glenoides texanaria, the Texas gray moth, is a moth in the  family Geometridae. It is found in North America, where it has been recorded from Massachusetts to Florida and from Missouri to Texas.

The wingspan is 16–24 mm. The wings are grey with fine black lines. Both wings have warm brown shading in the subterminal area. Adults are mainly on wing from January to April and from June to December in Florida.

References

Moths described in 1888
Boarmiini